

451001–451100 

|-bgcolor=#f2f2f2
| colspan=4 align=center | 
|}

451101–451200 

|-id=138
| 451138 Rizvanov ||  || Naufal Gayazovich Rizvanov (1930–2012) was a Soviet and Russian astronomer, and a full professor of astrometry and celestial mechanics. He initiated and organized the construction of the Kazan State University observatories at Nakhichevan (1960) and Zelenchuk (1971). || 
|}

451201–451300 

|-bgcolor=#f2f2f2
| colspan=4 align=center | 
|}

451301–451400 

|-bgcolor=#f2f2f2
| colspan=4 align=center | 
|}

451401–451500 

|-bgcolor=#f2f2f2
| colspan=4 align=center | 
|}

451501–451600 

|-bgcolor=#f2f2f2
| colspan=4 align=center | 
|}

451601–451700 

|-bgcolor=#f2f2f2
| colspan=4 align=center | 
|}

451701–451800 

|-bgcolor=#f2f2f2
| colspan=4 align=center | 
|}

451801–451900 

|-bgcolor=#f2f2f2
| colspan=4 align=center | 
|}

451901–452000 

|-bgcolor=#f2f2f2
| colspan=4 align=center | 
|}

References 

451001-452000